Edward D. "Ed" Lazowska is an American computer scientist. He is a Professor, and the Bill & Melinda Gates Chair emeritus, in the Paul G. Allen School of Computer Science & Engineering at the University of Washington.

Scholarship
Lazowska’s research and teaching concern the design, implementation, and analysis of high-performance computing and communication systems, and, more recently, the techniques and technologies of data-intensive science.

He co-authored the definitive textbook on computer system performance analysis using queuing network models, contributed to several early object-oriented distributed systems, and co-developed widely used approaches to kernel and system design in areas such as thread management, high-performance local and remote communication, load sharing, cluster computing, and the effective use of the underlying architecture by the operating system.

From 2008 to 2017 he served as the Founding Director of the University of Washington eScience Institute, one of three partners (along with Berkeley and New York University) in the Data Science Environments effort sponsored by the Gordon and Betty Moore Foundation and the Alfred P. Sloan Foundation.

Leadership
Lazowska chaired the Computing Research Association from 1997 to 2001, the NSF CISE Advisory Committee from 1998 to 1999, the DARPA Information Science And Technology Study Group from 2004 to 2006, the President’s Information Technology Advisory Committee (co-chair with Marc Benioff) from 2003 to 2005, and the Working Group of the President’s Council of Advisors on Science and Technology to review the Federal Networking and Information Technology Research and Development Program in 2010 (co-chair with David E. Shaw).

From 2007 to 2013 he served as Founding Chair of the Computing Community Consortium, a national effort to engage the computing research community in fundamental research motivated by tackling societal challenges.

He served as Chair of University of Washington Computer Science & Engineering from 1993 to 2001, a period during which that program consolidated its reputation as one of the top computer science programs in the nation and the world.

A long-time advocate for increasing participation in the field, Lazowska has served on the Executive Advisory Council of the National Center for Women & Information Technology, on the National Academies Committee on Women in Science, Engineering, and Medicine, and on the National Academies study committee on the Impacts of Sexual Harassment in Academia.

Civic Engagement
Lazowska has served as a board member or technical advisor for a number of technology companies, venture firms, and technology-oriented civic organizations, including the Allen Institute for Artificial Intelligence, Microsoft Research, Madrona Venture Group, the Washington Technology Industry Association, and the Technology Alliance.

Students
Lazowska has mentored many dozens of graduate students and many hundreds of undergraduate students. Among the best known are Hank Levy (University of Washington), Yi-Bing Lin (National Chiao Tung University), Tom Anderson (University of Washington), Ed Felten (Princeton University), and Christophe Bisciglia (successively Google, Cloudera, and WibiData).

Recognition
Lazowska is a Member and Councillor of the National Academy of Engineering, a Fellow of the American Academy of Arts & Sciences, a Member of the Washington State Academy of Sciences, and a Fellow of the Association for Computing Machinery, the Institute of Electrical and Electronics Engineers, and the American Association for the Advancement of Science.

In recognition of his national leadership Lazowska received the Computing Research Association Distinguished Service Award, the Association for Computing Machinery Presidential Award, and the ACM Distinguished Service Award.

Regionally, he received the 2007 University of Washington Computer Science & Engineering Undergraduate Teaching Award, the 2012 Howard Vollum Award for Distinguished Accomplishment in Science and Technology, the 1998 University of Washington Outstanding Public Service Award (for his K-12 outreach activities), and the 2015 University of Washington David B. Thorud Leadership Award (for his institutional leadership activities).

In honor of Lazowska's 70th birthday in August 2020, Peter Lee and Jeff Dean began raising funds to endow a set of Lazowska Professorships at the University of Washington. Joined by Harry Shum and Brad Smith, they contributed sufficient funds to endow the first professorship; others subsequently funded several more. A celebration was held on May 12, 2022, to recognize Lazowska and formally announce the professorships.

Personal history
Lazowska was born on August 3, 1950 in Washington, D.C. He obtained his A.B. at Brown University in 1972, advised by Andries van Dam and David J. Lewis, and his M.Sc. in 1974 and Ph.D. in 1977 at the University of Toronto, advised by Kenneth C. Sevcik. He is married to Lyndsay Downs. They have two sons, Adam and Jeremy.

References

1950 births
Living people
American computer scientists
Fellows of the Association for Computing Machinery
Members of the United States National Academy of Engineering